Justin J. Pearson (born ) is an American politician. A Democrat, he is currently a member of the Tennessee House of Representatives representing the 86th district, which covers parts of the city of Memphis. He was elected in a January 24, 2023, special election to succeed Barbara Cooper, who was posthumously re-elected in the 2022 Tennessee House of Representatives election after dying on October 25, 2022. 

When he was sworn into office at the age of 28, Pearson became the second youngest lawmaker serving in the Tennessee House of Representatives.

Early life and education
Justin J. Pearson was born in Memphis, Tennessee. His father was a preacher, while his mother was a teacher. When he was 11 years old, his family moved to the Washington, D.C. area while his father pursued a master's degree at Howard University. 

Four years later, they returned to Memphis, where he was shocked at the contrast between his previous high school in Centreville, Virginia, and his new school, which was underfunded. At Mitchell High School in inner-city Memphis, Pearson became active in student government; lobbied for textbooks and AP classes; and joined the debate team. He graduated as valedictorian of his high school class. 

In 2017, Pearson graduated from Bowdoin College in Brunswick, Maine, majoring in Government & Legal Studies with a minor in Education Studies. While at Bowdoin, he was a Mellon Mays fellow, and was accepted to the summer public policy institute at the Princeton School of Public and International Affairs.

Environmental activism 
Pearson founded the advocacy group Memphis Community Against Pollution (formerly known as Memphis Community Against the Pipeline), which successfully fought to cancel the Byhalia Pipeline. The pipeline was planned to run for 49 miles, including over the Memphis sand aquifer, which is used to provide water to residents in the Memphis area. The pipeline was also planned to run through poor Black neighborhoods in south Memphis.

Political career
Barbara Cooper, who had served in the Tennessee House of Representatives since 1996, died on October 25, 2022. She was posthumously re-elected, necessitating a special election to fill the seat. Pearson ran in the Democratic primary for the seat, held on January 24, 2023. He won the primary with 52.35% of the vote. No Republicans or independents filed for the seat, his victory in the Democratic primary ensured his election.

Because no general election was necessary, the Shelby County commission voted unanimously on January 25, 2023, to appoint him as interim state representative for the seat, so he could begin serving immediately. Pearson was sworn-in on February 9, 2023, becoming the second youngest lawmaker to serve the Tennessee House of Representatives at the age of 28.

Following the death of Tyre Nichols, Pearson stated that he intended to introduce a bill to prevent police officers with criminal records from transferring across departments, but also blamed inadequate police training, policies, and culture as contributing factors to his death. Pearson said he will be serving on the Criminal Justice Committee of the Tennessee House of Representatives.

While being sworn into the house, he wore a dashiki, a traditional West African garment appropriated in the late twentieth century by African-American activists. He was criticized on the floor by representative David B. Hawk and the Tennessee House Republicans tweeted that Pearson "should explore a different career opportunity" and referenced non-existent dress rules for the house in criticism of his attire. Pearson criticized the responses as being racist.

Electoral history

References

External links

Democratic Party members of the Tennessee House of Representatives
21st-century American politicians
Politicians from Memphis, Tennessee
Bowdoin College alumni
Living people
1997 births